Polyptychus dentatus, the straight-lined crenulate hawkmoth, is a moth of the family Sphingidae. It is known from Sri Lanka, tropical India and tropical Pakistan.

The wingspan is 92–120 mm. The forewing upperside ground colour is grey-brown with darker brown transverse lines. The antemedian, postmedian and submarginal lines are well-developed and almost straight. The median line is sinuous and inconspicuous. There is a strongly serrate line present between the postmedian and submarginal lines.

In India, larvae have been recorded on Cordia dichotoma, Cordia sebestena and Ehretia laevis. There are six larval instars, the first of which does not eat any plant material, instead the newly hatched larva eats the egg-shell and then rests without eating for about two days, after which it makes the first moult and only then commences feeding on leaves. Mature larvae are about 100 mm long.

References

Polyptychus
Moths described in 1777